Trichodocus is a genus of longhorn beetles of the subfamily Lamiinae, containing the following species:

 Trichodocus albosticticus Breuning, 1967
 Trichodocus rufus Breuning, 1939
 Trichodocus strandi Breuning, 1940

References

Theocridini